Jude Broughton (born 3 August 1963) is a former New Zealand rugby union and touch football player. She debuted for the Black Ferns against the Netherlands on 26 August at Ashburton at RugbyFest 1990. Her sister is fellow Black Fern Florence Broughton.

In 2019 Broughton won the Masters League Crossfit Games in the 55 to 59 age group in Melbourne.

References 

1963 births
Living people
New Zealand female rugby union players
New Zealand women's international rugby union players
Touch footballers
CrossFit athletes